Cody Allen Satterwhite (born January 27, 1987) is an American professional baseball pitcher who is currently a free agent. He has played in Nippon Professional Baseball (NPB) for the Hanshin Tigers.

Career

Detroit Tigers
Satterwhite attended Hillcrest Christian High School in Jackson, Mississippi, and the University of Mississippi. The Detroit Tigers selected Satterwhite in the second round of the 2008 MLB draft. The Tigers promoted him to the Erie SeaWolves of the Class AA Eastern League in 2009. He required surgery on his labrum in 2010 and surgery to repair scar tissue in 2012.

The Tigers released Satterwhite in February 2012.

Sioux City Explorers
In 2013, Satterwhite signed with the Sioux City Explorers of the American Association of Independent Professional Baseball.

New York Mets
The New York Mets signed Satterwhite out of Sioux City in 2013. He pitched for the Binghamton Mets of the Eastern League in 2014, and was named an All-Star.

Los Angeles Angels
Satterwhite signed a minor league contract with the Los Angeles Angels for the 2016 season, and played for the Salt Lake Bees.

Hanshin Tigers
He signed with the Hanshin Tigers of Nippon Professional Baseball's Central League during the 2016 season.

Baltimore Orioles
He signed a minor league contract with the Baltimore Orioles in early 2017. But was released after spring training.

Washington Nationals
On April 20, 2017, Satterwhite signed a minor league contract with the Washington Nationals. He resigned with the Nationals for the 2018 season.  He was released on May 31, 2018.

Diablos Rojos del México
On July 2, 2018, Satterwhite signed with the Diablos Rojos del México of the Mexican League. He was released on July 23, 2018.

See also
List of Pan American Games medalists in baseball

References

External links

1987 births
Living people
American expatriate baseball players in Japan
American expatriate baseball players in Mexico
Baseball players at the 2007 Pan American Games
Baseball players from Jackson, Mississippi
Binghamton Mets players
Diablos Rojos del México players
Erie SeaWolves players
Gulf Coast Tigers players
Hanshin Tigers players
Lakeland Flying Tigers players
Las Vegas 51s players
Mexican League baseball pitchers
Nippon Professional Baseball pitchers
Ole Miss Rebels baseball players
Pan American Games medalists in baseball
Pan American Games silver medalists for the United States
Salt Lake Bees players
Scottsdale Scorpions players
Sioux City Explorers players
St. Lucie Mets players
Syracuse Chiefs players
Tiburones de La Guaira players
American expatriate baseball players in Venezuela
United States national baseball team players
2015 WBSC Premier12 players
Medalists at the 2007 Pan American Games